Darrel is a given name. Notable people with the name include:

 Darrel Akerfelds (1962–2012), American baseball pitcher and bullpen coach
 Darrel Anholt (born 1962), Canadian ice hockey defenceman
 Darrel Aschbacher (born 1935), American football player
 Darrel Aubertine (born 1953), American politician in the New York State Senate
 Darrel Baldock (1938–2011), Australian rules football player and coach
 Darrel Brown (born 1984), sprinter from Trinidad and Tobago
 Darrel Brown (basketball) (1923–1990), American basketball player
 Darrel Castillo (born 1992) Guatemalan judoka
 Darrel Chaney (born 1948), American baseball player and announcer
 Darrel Chapman (1937–1992), Australian rugby league player
 Darrel Cunningham (born 1948), Canadian politician
 Darrel R. Falk (born 1946), American biologist
 Darrel Frost (born 1951), American herpetologist and systematist
 Darrel Guilbeau (born 1962), American actor
 Darrel Verner Heald (1919–2010), Canadian lawyer and political figure 
 Darrel Higham (born 1970), English rockabilly guitarist
 Darrel Johnson (born 1959), American basketball coach
 Darrel Knibbs (born 1949), Canadian ice hockey player
 Darrel McHargue (born 1954), American horse racing jockey
 Darrel R. Miller (1929-2010), American farmer and politician
 Darrel Mosel, American politician from Minnesota
 Darrel Peterson (1939–1994), American politician from Minnesota
 Darrel Petties (born 1983), American gospel musician, worship leader and pastor
 Darrel Ray (born 1950), American psychologist
 Darrel Reid (born 1957), Canadian policy advisor and political manager
 Darrel Scoville (born 1975), Canadian ice hockey defenceman
 Darrel Stinson (born 1945), Canadian politician from British Columbia
 Darrel Sutton (born c. 1948), Canadian curler
 Darrel Treece-Birch (born 1967), English rock keyboard player and songwriter
 Darrel Williams (born 1995), American football running back and fullback
 Darrel Young (born 1987), American football fullback

See also
 Darrell
 Darel
 Darell 
 Darroll
 Daryl
 Darryl
 Durrell
 Derrell